Kai Winding is an eponymous album by jazz trombonist and arranger Kai Winding recorded in 1963 for the Verve label.

Reception

The Allmusic review by Tony Wilds observed "Released between the classic More (Mondo Cane) albums, the eponymous Kai Winding serves up more mod trombone with ondioline and "water sound" guitar on some tracks. ...Unfortunately, there is no central theme and most of the tunes, brief as they are, rank as filler".

Track listing
 "Get Lost" (Claus Ogerman) - 2:38
 "Only in America" (Jerry Leiber, Mike Stoller, Cynthia Weil, Barry Mann) - 2:22
 "Hey, Girl" (Carole King, Gerry Goffin) - 3:05
 "The Lonely One" (David Whitaker, Peter Pavey) - 2:15
 "Theme from "Mr. Novak"" (Lyn Murray) - 1:52
 "Washington Square" (Bob Goldstein) - 2:04
 "The Ice Cream Man" (Joe Meek) - 2:15
 "Mockingbird" (Charlie Fox, Inez Fox) - 2:15
 "China Surf" (Ingrid Otto) - 2:40
 "Burning Sands" (Werner Scharfenberger, Kurt Feltz) - 1:52
 "Far Out East" (Kai Winding) - 2:00
 "Oltre l'Amor" (Antonio de Paolis) - 2:05
Recorded in New York City on August 7, 1963 (tracks 4, 5, 7, 10 & 12), September 19, 1963 (tracks 1, 9 & 11), September 26, 1963 (tracks 2 & 3) and October 3, 1963 (tracks 6 & 8)

Personnel 
Kai Winding - trombone, arranger
Gary Sherman - organ
Other unidentified musicians
Claus Ogerman - arranger, conductor

References 

1963 albums
Verve Records albums
Kai Winding albums
Albums produced by Creed Taylor
Albums arranged by Claus Ogerman